Appleton Academy may refer to

Appleton Academy, a school in Wyke, England
Appleton Academy, Mont Vernon, a former school in New Hampshire, United States
New Ipswich Academy, also known as Appleton Academy, a former school in New Ipswich, New Hampshire